Jon Mun-sop (November 24, 1919 – December 29, 1998) was a North Korean politician, member of the Supreme People's Assembly, the unicameral parliament of North Korea.

Biography
Jon was born in Manchuria on November 24, 1919. He took part in the armed struggle against the Japanese colonial rule in Korea at age 18. With the establishment of the Democratic People's Republic of Korea and became a vice Minister of Public Safety in 1963, chairman of the Control Committee in 1972 and a party Politburo member in 1976. Since October 1980 he was member of the 6th Central Committee of the Workers' Party of Korea.  He was Honorable one of four Vice Presidents of the Presidium of the 10th convocation of the Supreme People's Assembly.

Works

References

1919 births
1998 deaths
Korean communists
Korean independence activists
North Korean atheists
Members of the Supreme People's Assembly
Members of the 5th Political Committee of the Workers' Party of Korea
Members of the 6th Politburo of the Workers' Party of Korea
Members of the 4th Central Committee of the Workers' Party of Korea
Members of the 5th Central Committee of the Workers' Party of Korea
Members of the 6th Central Committee of the Workers' Party of Korea